Mark Kendall (born 1982) is an American artist and filmmaker. He was a 2014 Guggenheim Fellow, a 2015 MacDowell Colony Fellow, and the recipient of a 2016 Pew Fellowship in the Arts.

Early life and education 
Kendall was born in Minneapolis and raised in the Philadelphia area. He received both his B.A. (2005) and M.A. (2008) from Vanderbilt University, and a Master of Fine Arts from New York's School of Visual Arts (2011). He is an alumnus of Berlinale Talents.

Work 
Kendall's work as a filmmaker blends documentary and fictional techniques, exploring a range of social, political, and cultural issues in unexpected ways that question conventions of value.

In 2011, Kendall was selected by the Film Society of Lincoln Center and the Independent Filmmaker Project (IFP) for  their inaugural “Emerging Visions” Fellowship program at the 2011 New York Film Festival.

His feature directorial debut, La Camioneta, premiered at the 2012 SXSW Film Festival and marked him as “a name to watch” in Variety. During its theatrical release, the film was selected by Stephen Holden as a New York Times Critics' Pick and named as one of IndieWire's “Top Docs of 2013”.

Recognition 
Kendall was awarded the Guggenheim Fellowship in 2014 and the Pew Fellowship in 2016.

References 

1982 births
Living people
American documentary filmmakers
American experimental filmmakers
Pew Fellows in the Arts
American conceptual artists
MacDowell Colony fellows
Vanderbilt University alumni
School of Visual Arts alumni
People from Minneapolis
Episcopal Academy alumni